B4U may refer to:

Broadcast media
 B4U (network), a Bollywood media corporation
B4U (TV channel), an Indian satellite television station
 B4U Movies, a television station focusing on movies owned by B4U Networks
ATN B4U Movies, the Canadian version of the station
 B4U Music, a television station focusing on music owned by B4U Networks
ATN B4U Music, the Canadian version of the station
 B4U Aflam, a television station focusing on Hindi movies in Arabic owned by B4U Networks
B4U Bhojpuri, a television station focusing on Bhojpuri movies owned by B4U Networks

Music
 BeForU, a J-pop group
 BeForU (album), the first album by the group